Rosedale is a suburb on the North Shore of Auckland, New Zealand. It is located 12 kilometres north of the city centre, to the south of the suburbs of Pinehill and Albany. It is under the local governance of the Auckland Council.

The business and light industrial area of Rosedale was given the name North Harbour Industrial Estate when construction commenced on it in the 1990s. The former North Shore City Council the changed the name of this area back to Rosedale in 2009, as a result of a broader review of suburb names and boundaries in the North Shore. This area is sometimes referred to by the former name. Business North Harbour, the association responsible for the area's business improvement district, retains the place name of North Harbour in their name. Business North Harbour was unhappy with the name change to Rosedale, describing the name as a "stinker" due to the association with the Rosedale Wastewater Treatment Plant and former landfill located in the suburb. Some businesses in Rosedale use North Harbour in their names and as the suburb in their addresses.

This area of the suburb is also sometimes referred to as Interplex, arising from the 47 hectare "interplex@albany" business park subdivision that commenced construction in 2001 and was completed in 2006.

On the name of Rosedale, The New Zealand Geographic board states "the name for Rosedale has existed for many years, but the current boundary is newly defined. In 1961 new large Oxidation Ponds were built in the valley between Rosedale Road in the North and Sunset Road in the South. They were named Rosedale Oxidation Ponds and at that time were surrounded by rural holdings." Newspaper articles from the 1890s show that there was a Rosedale estate in the Albany area owned by the Stevenson family, where an orchard was cultivated.

The suburb is home to the Rosedale Wastewater Treatment Plant, the second largest sewage works in Auckland. The plant was initially opened in 1962, and now processes the wastewater of an estimated 253,000 inhabitants, servicing the area of the North Shore from Devonport to Long Bay. A notable feature of the area is Rosedale Dam, containing treated wastewater fed from the sewage works. The dam is visible when travelling through State Highway 1. In the event of a dam breach, the dam poses a risk of flooding to the local community within the flow path hazard zone. The dam is at the greatest risk of a breach during an earthquake or high rainfall event.

Rosedale is also known for the large general refuse landfill that operated from the 1950s to 2009, accepting only clean fill from 2002 to 2008. The landfill was bordered by Greville Road on the north, Rosedale Road on the south, State Highway 1 on the west and Hugh Green Drive on the east. The area is now the Rosedale Landfill Reserve and public access is prohibited due to toxic gas and liquid run off. The high levels of volatile methane gas present are harnessed for power generation. The suburb remains a hub for refuse services with a Waste Management transfer station operating adjacent to the bottom of the former landfill site on Rosedale Road. A large Envirowaste transfer and recycling facility is also located in the suburb on Constellation Drive.

Demographics

The North Harbour statistical area, that Rosedale is included in, had a population of 816 at the 2018 New Zealand census, an increase of 252 people (44.7%) since the 2013 census, and an increase of 366 people (81.3%) since the 2006 census. There were 276 households. There were 432 males and 387 females, giving a sex ratio of 1.12 males per female. The median age was 38.7 years, with 84 people (10.3%) aged under 15 years, 186 (22.8%) aged 15 to 29, 366 (44.9%) aged 30 to 64, and 183 (22.4%) aged 65 or older.

Ethnicities were 64.7% European/Pākehā, 5.9% Māori, 1.1% Pacific peoples, 29.0% Asian, and 4.0% other ethnicities (totals add to more than 100% since people could identify with multiple ethnicities).

The proportion of people born overseas was 45.2%, compared with 27.1% nationally.

Although some people objected to giving their religion, 52.6% had no religion, 37.5% were Christian, and 7.0% had other religions.

Of those at least 15 years old, 192 (26.2%) people had a bachelor or higher degree, and 93 (12.7%) people had no formal qualifications. The median income was $34,900. The employment status of those at least 15 was that 381 (52.0%) people were employed full-time, 84 (11.5%) were part-time, and 15 (2.0%) were unemployed.

References

Suburbs of Auckland
North Shore, New Zealand